Christopher Thomas Nichting (born May 13, 1966) is an American former professional baseball player.  A pitcher, Nichting played for the Texas Rangers, Cleveland Indians, Cincinnati Reds, and Colorado Rockies of Major League Baseball (MLB).  Nichting is an alumnus of Elder High School in Cincinnati.

External links

1966 births
Living people
Albuquerque Dukes players
American expatriate baseball players in Canada
Baseball players at the 1987 Pan American Games
Baseball players from Cincinnati
Buffalo Bisons (minor league) players
Cincinnati Reds players
Cleveland Indians players
Columbus Clippers players
Colorado Rockies players
Colorado Springs Sky Sox players
Edmonton Trappers players
Elder High School alumni
Louisville RiverBats players
Major League Baseball pitchers
Northwestern Wildcats baseball players
Oklahoma City 89ers players
Pan American Games medalists in baseball
Pan American Games silver medalists for the United States
San Antonio Missions players
Texas Rangers players
Vero Beach Dodgers players
Medalists at the 1987 Pan American Games